Monasterio de San Martín (Villaviciosa) is a monastery in Asturias, Spain.

Monasteries in Asturias